Norstead: A Viking Village and Port of Trade is a reconstruction of a Viking Age settlement. Located near L'Anse aux Meadows in Newfoundland, Norstead won the provincial Attractions Canada award for "Best New Attraction" in 2000, and was the centerpiece of a series of events held that year to commemorate the 1,000th anniversary of the Vikings' arrival. The site also houses a 54-foot replica Viking knarr which sailed from Greenland to L’Anse aux Meadows in 1998 with a crew of nine men.

References

External links
 Norstead website

Viking reenactment
Museums in Newfoundland and Labrador
Open-air museums in Canada
Living museums in Canada
Viking Age museums